Mohamed Adel may refer to:

 Mohamed Adel (referee) (born 1978), Egyptian football referee
 Mohamed Emam (Mohamed Adel Mohamed Emam, born 1984), Egyptian actor
 Mohamed Adel (footballer, born 1992), Egyptian footballer
 Mohamed Adel (footballer, born 1996), Bahraini footballer
 Mohamed Adel Gomaa (born 1993), Egyptian footballer